Mohammed Al-Khori (Arabic:محمد الخوري) (born 1 January 1993) is an Emirati footballer who currently plays for Baniyas as a midfielder.

External links

References

Emirati footballers
1993 births
Living people
Al Jazira Club players
Al Ahli Club (Dubai) players
Al Dhafra FC players
Baniyas Club players
UAE Pro League players
Association football midfielders
Footballers at the 2014 Asian Games
Asian Games competitors for the United Arab Emirates